Memories is a studio album by Pat Boone, released in 1966 on Dot Records.

The album was arranged and conducted by Ernie Freeman.

Track listing

References 

1966 albums
Pat Boone albums
Dot Records albums
Albums produced by Randy Wood (record producer)